The 2019–20 Liga IV Sălaj is the 52nd season of Liga IV Sălaj, the fourth tier of the Romanian football league system. The season is scheduled began on 31 August 2019 and was scheduled to end in June 2020, but was suspended in March because of the COVID-19 pandemic in Romania. 

Sportul Șimleu Silvaniei was declared the county champion and the representative of Sălaj County at the promotion play-off to Liga III.

Team changes

To Liga IV Sălaj
Relegated from Liga III
 —
Promoted from Liga V Sălaj
 —

From Liga IV Sălaj
Promoted to Liga III
 Unirea Mirșid
Relegated to Liga V Sălaj
 Flacăra Hălmașd

Competition format
The league consisted of 11 teams and will play a regular season, followed by a championship play-off. The regular season is a double round-robin tournament. At the end of regular season, the first 4 ranked teams will qualify for championship play-off and the winner will participate for promotion play-off to Liga III.

League table

Promotion play-off

Champions of Liga IV – Sălaj County face champions of Liga IV – Bistrița-Năsăud County and Liga IV – Maramureș County.

Region 2 (North–West)

Group B

See also

Main Leagues
 2019–20 Liga I
 2019–20 Liga II
 2019–20 Liga III
 2019–20 Liga IV

County Leagues (Liga IV series)

 2019–20 Liga IV Alba
 2019–20 Liga IV Arad
 2019–20 Liga IV Argeș
 2019–20 Liga IV Bacău
 2019–20 Liga IV Bihor
 2019–20 Liga IV Bistrița-Năsăud
 2019–20 Liga IV Botoșani
 2019–20 Liga IV Brăila
 2019–20 Liga IV Brașov
 2019–20 Liga IV Bucharest
 2019–20 Liga IV Buzău
 2019–20 Liga IV Călărași
 2019–20 Liga IV Caraș-Severin
 2019–20 Liga IV Cluj
 2019–20 Liga IV Constanța
 2019–20 Liga IV Covasna
 2019–20 Liga IV Dâmbovița
 2019–20 Liga IV Dolj 
 2019–20 Liga IV Galați
 2019–20 Liga IV Giurgiu
 2019–20 Liga IV Gorj
 2019–20 Liga IV Harghita
 2019–20 Liga IV Hunedoara
 2019–20 Liga IV Ialomița
 2019–20 Liga IV Iași
 2019–20 Liga IV Ilfov
 2019–20 Liga IV Maramureș
 2019–20 Liga IV Mehedinți
 2019–20 Liga IV Mureș
 2019–20 Liga IV Neamț
 2019–20 Liga IV Olt
 2019–20 Liga IV Prahova
 2019–20 Liga IV Satu Mare
 2019–20 Liga IV Sibiu
 2019–20 Liga IV Suceava
 2019–20 Liga IV Teleorman
 2019–20 Liga IV Timiș
 2019–20 Liga IV Tulcea
 2019–20 Liga IV Vâlcea
 2019–20 Liga IV Vaslui
 2019–20 Liga IV Vrancea

References

External links
 Official website 

Liga IV seasons
Sport in Sălaj County